John Raymond "Jack" Wyatt ( October 14, 1913 – May 23, 2004) was bishop of the Episcopal Diocese of Spokane from 1967 to 1978.

External links 
Online obituary

1913 births
2004 deaths
20th-century American Episcopalians
Episcopal bishops of Spokane
20th-century American clergy